A telegraphist (British English), telegrapher (American English), or telegraph operator is an operator who uses a telegraph key to send and receive the Morse code in order to communicate by land lines or radio.

During the Great War the Royal Navy enlisted many volunteers as radio telegraphists. Telegraphists were indispensable at sea in the early days of wireless telegraphy, and many young men were called to sea as professional radiotelegraph operators who were always accorded high-paying officer status at sea. Subsequent to the Titanic disaster and the Radio Act of 1912, the International Safety of Life at Sea (SOLAS) conventions established the 500kHz maritime distress frequency monitoring and  mandated that all passenger-carrying ships carry licensed radio telegraph operators.

In popular culture
The telegraphist mouse in Australia and the Marshall Islands from The Rescuers Down Under.

See also 

 Amateur radio
 Casa del Telegrafista (House of the Telegrapher), a museum in Colombia
 Commercial Cable Company
 List of telegraphists
 Morse code
 Prosigns for Morse code
 telegraph key
 Transatlantic telegraph cable
 Sinking of the RMS Titanic

References

Obsolete occupations
Broadcasting occupations